The 1994 Cork Senior Hurling Championship was the 106th staging of the Cork Senior Hurling Championship since its establishment by the Cork County Board in 1887. The draw for the opening fixtures took place on 12 December 1994. The championship ended on 11 September 1994.

St. Finbarr's entered the championship as the defending champions, however, they were defeated by Midleton in the semi-finals.

The final was played on 11 September 1994 at Páirc Uí Chaoimh in Cork, between Carbery and Midleton, in what was their first ever meeting in the final. Carbery won the match by 3-13 to 3-06 to claim their first ever championship title. It remans their only championship title.

Brian Cunningham was the championship's top scorer with 4-13.

Team changes

To Championship

Promoted from the Cork Intermediate Hurling Championship
 Youghal

Results

First round

Second round

Quarter-finals

Semi-finals

Final

Championship statistics

Top scorers

Overall

In a single game

Miscellaneous

Carbery win their first title and in the process become the first,and to date, only West Cork side to win a SHC title.

References

Cork Senior Hurling Championship
Cork Senior Hurling Championship